The Roman Catholic Diocese of Weihui/Weíhwei/Jixian is a diocese located in the city of Weihui in the Ecclesiastical province of Kaifeng in China.

History
 1869: Established as Apostolic Vicariate of Northern Honan 河南北境 from the Apostolic Vicariate of Honan 河南
 August 2, 1929: Renamed as Apostolic Vicariate of Weihuifu 衛輝府
 April 11, 1946: Promoted as Diocese of Weihui 衛輝

Leadership
 Bishops of Weihui 衛輝 (Roman rite)
 Bishop Joseph Zhang Yinlin (2016 - )
 Bishop Thomas Zhang Huai-xin (1981 - 2016)
 Bishop Mario Civelli, P.I.M.E. (July 18, 1946 – February 2, 1966)
 Vicars Apostolic of Northern Honan 河南北境 (Roman Rite)
 Bishop Martino Chiolino, P.I.M.E. (February 23, 1921 – 1929)
 Bishop Giovanni Menicatti, P.I.M.E. (September 12, 1903 – 1919)
 Bishop Giovanni Domenico Rizzolati, O.F.M. (August 30, 1839 – 1856)

References

 GCatholic.org
 Catholic Hierarchy

Roman Catholic dioceses in China
Religious organizations established in 1869
Roman Catholic dioceses and prelatures established in the 19th century
1869 establishments in China
Christianity in Henan
Religion in Xinxiang